Cherry is an album by American jazz organist Jimmy McGriff featuring performances recorded in 1966 and originally released on the Solid State label.

Reception
The AllMusic site gave the album 3 stars.

Track listing
 "Cherry" (Don Redman, Ray Gilbert) - 2:20
 "Tequila" (Chuck Rio) - 3:07
 "Hit the Road Jack" (Percy Mayfield) - 2:52
 "Watermelon Man" (Herbie Hancock) - 2:55
 "Blue Moon" (Richard Rodgers, Lorenz Hart) - 3:20
 "The Comeback" (L.C. Frazier) - 2:40
 "I Left My Heart in San Francisco" (George Cory, Douglass Cross) - 3:00
 "The Way You Look Tonight" (Dorothy Fields, Jerome Kern) - 4:03
 "On the Sunny Side of the Street" (Jimmy McHugh, Fields) - 3:10
 "Just Friends" (John Klenner, Sam M. Lewis) - 4:05
 "The Shadow of Your Smile" (Johnny Mandel, Paul Francis Webster) - 3:20

Personnel
Jimmy McGriff - organ, vocals
Eric Gale - guitar solos
Everett Barksdale - rhythm guitar 
Milt Hinton - bass
Grady Tate - drums

References

Solid State Records (jazz label) albums
Jimmy McGriff albums
1966 albums
Albums produced by Sonny Lester